In telecommunications, broadband is the wide-bandwidth data transmission that transports multiple signals at a wide range of frequencies and Internet traffic types, which enables messages to be sent simultaneously and is used in fast internet connections. The medium can be coaxial cable, optical fiber, wireless Internet (radio), twisted pair, or satellite.

In the context of Internet access, broadband is used to mean any high-speed Internet access that is always on and faster than dial-up access over traditional analog or ISDN PSTN services.

Overview
Different criteria for "broad" have been applied in different contexts and at different times. Its origin is in physics, acoustics, and radio systems engineering, where it had been used with a meaning similar to "wideband", or in the context of audio noise reduction systems, where it indicated a single-band rather than a multiple-audio-band system design of the compander. Later, with the advent of digital telecommunications, the term was mainly used for transmission over multiple channels. Whereas a passband signal is also modulated so that it occupies higher frequencies (compared to a baseband signal which is bound to the lowest end of the spectrum, see line coding), it is still occupying a single channel. The key difference is that what is typically considered a broadband signal in this sense is a signal that occupies multiple (non-masking, orthogonal) passbands, thus allowing for much higher throughput over a single medium but with additional complexity in the transmitter/receiver circuitry.

The term became popularized through the 1990s as a marketing term for Internet access that was faster than dial-up access (dial-up being typically limited to a maximum of 56 kbit/s). This meaning is only distantly related to its original technical meaning.

Since 1999, broadband Internet access has been a factor in public policy. In that year, at the World Trade Organization Biannual Conference called “Financial Solutions to Digital Divide” in Seattle, the term “Meaningful Broadband” was introduced to the world leaders, leading to the activation of a movement to close the digital divide. Fundamental aspects of this movement are to suggest that the equitable distribution of broadband is a fundamental human right.

Broadband technologies

Telecommunications 
In telecommunications, a broadband signalling method is one that handles a wide band of frequencies. "Broadband" is a relative term, understood according to its context. The wider (or broader) the bandwidth of a channel, the greater the data-carrying capacity, given the same channel quality.

In radio, for example, a very narrow band will carry Morse code, a broader band will carry speech, and a still broader band will carry music without losing the high audio frequencies required for realistic sound reproduction. This broad band is often divided into channels or "frequency bins" using passband techniques to allow frequency-division multiplexing instead of sending a higher-quality signal.

In data communications, a 56k modem will transmit a data rate of 56 kilobits per second (kbit/s) over a 4-kilohertz-wide telephone line (narrowband or voiceband). In the late 1980s, the Broadband Integrated Services Digital Network (B-ISDN) used the term to refer to a broad range of bit rates, independent of physical modulation details. The various forms of digital subscriber line (DSL) services are broadband in the sense that digital information is sent over multiple channels. Each channel is at a higher frequency than the baseband voice channel, so it can support plain old telephone service on a single pair of wires at the same time. However, when that same line is converted to a non-loaded twisted-pair wire (no telephone filters), it becomes hundreds of kilohertz wide (broadband) and can carry up to 100 megabits per second using very-high-bit-rate digital subscriber line (VDSL or VHDSL) techniques.

Cellular networks utilize various standards for data transmission, including 5G which can support one million separate devices per square kilometer.

Computer networks 
Many computer networks use a simple line code to transmit one type of signal using a medium's full bandwidth using its baseband (from zero through the highest frequency needed). Most versions of the popular Ethernet family are given names, such as the original 1980s 10BASE5, to indicate this. Networks that use cable modems on standard cable television infrastructure are called broadband to indicate the wide range of frequencies that can include multiple data users as well as traditional television channels on the same cable. Broadband systems usually use a different radio frequency modulated by the data signal for each band.

The total bandwidth of the medium is larger than the bandwidth of any channel.

The 10BROAD36 broadband variant of Ethernet was standardized by 1985, but was not commercially successful.

The DOCSIS standard became available to consumers in the late 1990s, to provide Internet access to cable television residential customers. Matters were further confused by the fact that the 10PASS-TS standard for Ethernet ratified in 2008 used DSL technology, and both cable and DSL modems often have Ethernet connectors on them.

TV and video
A television antenna may be described as "broadband" because it is capable of receiving a wide range of channels, while e.g. a low-VHF antenna is "narrowband" since it receives only 1 to 5 channels. The U.S. federal standard FS-1037C defines "broadband" as a synonym for wideband. "Broadband" in analog video distribution is traditionally used to refer to systems such as cable television, where the individual channels are modulated on carriers at fixed frequencies. In this context, baseband is the term's antonym, referring to a single channel of analog video, typically in composite form with separate baseband audio. The act of demodulating converts broadband video to baseband video. Fiber optic allows the signal to be transmitted farther without being repeated. Cable companies use a hybrid system using fiber to transmit the signal to neighborhoods and then changes the signal from light to radio frequency to be transmitted over coaxial cable to homes. Doing so reduces the use of having multiple head ends. A head end gathers all the information from the local cable networks and movie channels and then feeds the information into the system.

However, "broadband video" in the context of streaming Internet video has come to mean video files that have bit-rates high enough to require broadband Internet access for viewing. "Broadband video" is also sometimes used to describe IPTV Video on demand.

Alternative technologies
Power lines have also been used for various types of data communication. Although some systems for remote control are based on narrowband signaling, modern high-speed systems use broadband signaling to achieve very high data rates. One example is the ITU-T G.hn standard, which provides a way to create a local area network up to 1 Gigabit/s (which is considered high-speed as of 2014) using existing home business and home wiring (including power lines, but also phone lines and coaxial cables).

In 2014, researchers at Korea Advanced Institute of Science and Technology made developments on the creation of ultra-shallow broadband optical instruments.

Internet broadband

In the context of Internet access, the term "broadband" is used loosely to mean "access that is always on and faster than the traditional dial-up access".

A range of more precise definitions of speed have been prescribed at times, including:

 "Greater than the primary rate" (which ranged from about 1.5 to 2 Mbit/s) —CCITT in "broadband service" in 1988.
 "Internet access that is always on and faster than the traditional dial-up access" —US National Broadband Plan of 2009
 4 Mbit/s downstream, 1 Mbit/s upstream —Federal Communications Commission (FCC), 2010
 25 Mbit/s downstream, 3 Mbit/s upstream —FCC, 2015
50 Mbit/s downstream, 10 Mbit/s upstream —Canadian Radio-television and Telecommunications Commission (CRTC)

Broadband Internet service in the United States was effectively treated or managed as a public utility by net neutrality rules until being overturned by the FCC in December 2017.

Speed qualifiers
A number of national and international regulators categorize broadband connections according to upload and download speeds, stated in Mbit/s (megabits per second).

In Australia, the Australian Competition & Consumer Commission also requires Internet Service Providers to quote speed during night time and busy hours

Global bandwidth concentration

Bandwidth has historically been very unequally distributed worldwide, with increasing concentration in the digital age. Historically only 10 countries have hosted 70–75% of the global telecommunication capacity (see pie-chart Figure on the right). In 2014, only three countries (China, US, Japan) host 50% of the globally installed telecommunication bandwidth potential. The U.S. lost its global leadership in terms of installed bandwidth in 2011, being replaced by China, which hosts more than twice as much national bandwidth potential in 2014 (29% versus 13% of the global total).

See also

 Mobile broadband
 Ultra-wideband
 Wireless broadband

Nation specific:
 Broadband mapping in the United States
 Internet in Malaysia
 Internet in the United Kingdom
 List of broadband providers in the United States
 National broadband plans from around the world

References

External links
 
 

 
Digital technology

hi:विस्तृत पट्टी